The Gavarnie ringlet (Erebia gorgone) is a member of the subfamily Satyrinae of the family Nymphalidae. It is a high-altitude butterfly found in France and Spain, notably at Cirque de Gavarnie in the Pyrenees National Park.

Adults are on wing in July and August.

The larvae feed on various Poa species. The species overwinters in the larval stage.

References

Erebia
Butterflies of Europe
Butterflies described in 1832
Butterflies